Donald Cameron Brown (February 22, 1892 – October 26, 1963) was a Canadian politician. He served in the Legislative Assembly of British Columbia from 1949 to 1952  from the electoral district of Vancouver-Burrard, a member of the Coalition government.

References

1892 births
1963 deaths